Perletto is a comune (municipality) in the Province of Cuneo in the Italian region Piedmont, located about  southeast of Turin and about  northeast of Cuneo.

Geography
Perletto borders the following municipalities: Castino, Cortemilia, Olmo Gentile, San Giorgio Scarampi, Serole, and Vesime.

Demographic evolution

References

External links
 www.comuneperletto.it/

Cities and towns in Piedmont